Russell Harold Powell (born January 21, 1893) was a Negro leagues catcher. He played mostly for the Indianapolis ABCs.

References

External links
 and Baseball-Reference Black Baseball stats and Seamheads

Indianapolis ABCs players
1893 births
Year of death missing
People from Mount Pleasant, Ohio
Baseball catchers